Phaedimus cumingi is a beetle species belonging to the family Scarabaeidae, subfamily Cetoniinae.

Description
Pronotum and legs are metallic green, while elytra are yelllowish.

Distribution
This beetle is present in Philippines.

Etymology
Named to honour the collector Hugh Cuming.

References
 Waterhouse G.R. (1841) Descriptions of various Coleopterous insects brought from the Philippine Islands by Mr. Cuming, Journal of Proceedings of the Entomological Society of London :26-28
 Scarabs: World Scarabaeidae Database. Schoolmeesters P.
 Encyclopaedia of Life
 Insect Life Forms
 Philippines Beetles
 Barresfotonatura

Cetoniinae
Beetles described in 1841